The 2016 Vancouver International Film Festival, the 35th event in the history of the Vancouver International Film Festival, was held from September 29 to October 14, 2016.

The festival's opening gala film was Aisling Walsh's Maudie, and its closing gala was Terrence Mallick's Voyage of Time.

Awards
Award winners were announced on October 14.

Films

Special Presentations
American Honey — Andrea Arnold
The Birth of a Nation — Nate Parker
Elle — Paul Verhoeven
The Girl with All the Gifts — Colm McCarthy
Graduation (Bacalaureat) — Cristian Mungiu
The Handmaiden — Park Chan-wook
Human — Yann Arthus-Bertrand
I, Daniel Blake — Ken Loach
Julieta — Pedro Almodóvar
Manchester by the Sea — Kenneth Lonergan
Milton's Secret — Barnet Bain
Moonlight — Barry Jenkins
Toni Erdmann — Maren Ade

Contemporary World Cinema
Album — Mehmet Can Mertoğlu
All of a Sudden (Auf Einmal) — Aslı Özge
Aquarius — Kleber Mendonça Filho
As I Open My Eyes (À peine j'ouvre les yeux) — Leyla Bouzid
Barakah Meets Barakah — Mahmoud Sabbagh
Beyond the Mountains and Hills (Me'Ever Laharim Velagvaot) — Eran Kolirin
The Complexity of Happiness (La felicità è un sistema complesso) — Gianni Zanasi
The Confessions (Le confessioni) — Roberto Andò
The Death of Louis XIV (La Mort de Louis XIV) — Albert Serra
 — Michael Rösel
Donald Cried — Kristopher Avedisian
The Dreamed Path (Der traumhafte Weg) — Angela Schanelec
Endless Poetry (Poesía sin fin) — Alejandro Jodorowsky
The Giant (Jätten) — Johannes Nyholm
Glory (Slava) — Kristina Grozeva, Petar Valchanov
Golstone — Ivan Sen
A Good Wife (Dobra žena) — Mirjana Karanović
Green / Is / Gold — Ryon Baxter
The Happiest Day in the Life of Olli Mäki (Hymyilevä mies) — Juho Kuosmanen
Hedi — Mohamed Ben Attia
Hermia and Helena — Matías Piñeiro
History's Future — Fiona Tan
The Human Surge (El auge del humano) — Eduardo Williams
Inversion (Varoonegi) — Behnam Behzadi
Junction 48 — Udi Aloni
Kate Plays Christine — Robert Greene
Kékszakállú — Gastón Solnicki
Lantouri — Reza Dormishian
The Last Family (Ostatnia rodzina) — Jan P. Matuszyński
Like Crazy (La pazza gioia) — Paolo Virzì
Lily Lane (Liliom ösvény) — Benedek Fliegauf
Lost in Munich (Ztraceni v Mnichově) — Petr Zelenka
A Man Called Ove (En man som heter Ove) — Hannes Holm
Mother (Ema) — Kadri Kõusaare
Nakom — Kelly Daniela Norris, T. W. Pittman
Neruda — Pablo Larraín
 (Gleißendes Glück) — Sven Taddicken
The Ornithologist (O Ornitólogo) — João Pedro Rodrigues
Panamerican Machinery (Maquinaria Panamericana) — Joaquin del Paso
Paterson — Jim Jarmusch
Pihu — Vinod Kapri
A Quiet Passion — Terence Davies
Quit Staring at My Plate (Ne gledaj mi u pijat) — Hana Jušić
Radio Dreams — Babak Jalali
The Red Turtle (La Tortue Rouge) — Michaël Dudok de Wit
The Rehearsal — Alison Maclean
The River of Fables (Kothanodi) — Bhaskar Hazarika
The Salesman — Asghar Farhadi
Scarred Hearts (Inimi cicatrizate) — Radu Jude
Shepherds and Butchers — Oliver Schmitz
Short Stay — Ted Fendt
Sieranevada — Cristi Puiu
Sin Alas — Ben Chace
Sins of the Flesh (Haram El Gasad) — Khaled El Hagar
The Student — Kirill Serebrennikov
Suntan — Argyris Papadimitropoulos
Sweet Dreams (Fai bei sogni) — Marco Bellocchio
Tanna — Martin Butler, Bentley Dean
The Teacher (Učiteľka) — Jan Hřebejk
To Keep the Light — Erica Fae
The Trap (Ottaal) — Jayaraj Rajasekharan Nair
Twilight Over Burma (Dämmerung über Burma) — Sabine Derflinger
The Unknown Girl (La fille inconnue) — Jean-Pierre and Luc Dardenne
The Yard (Yarden) — Måns Månsson

Spotlight on France
After Love (L'Économie du couple) — Joachim Lafosse
Being 17 (Quand on a 17 ans) — André Téchiné
Chocolat — Roschdy Zem
Frantz — François Ozon
French Tour (Tour de France) — Rachid Djaïdani
Personal Shopper — Olivier Assayas
Saint-Amour — Benoît Delépine, Gustave de Kervern
The Son of Joseph (Le Fils de Joseph) — Eugène Green
Staying Vertical (Rester vertical) — Alain Guiraudie
Thanks, Boss! (Merci patron!) — François Ruffin
Things to Come (L'Avenir) — Mia Hansen-Løve

Documentaries
All This Panic — Jenny Gage
Between Fences — Avi Mograbi
Depth Two (Dubina dva) — Ognjen Glavonić
Ghostland — Simon Stadler
Growing Up Coy — Eric Juhola
The Infinite Flight of Days (El Infinito Vuelo de los Días) — Catalina Mesa
Kedi — Ceyda Torun
Keep Quiet — Joseph Martin, Sam Blair
The Killing$ of Tony Blair — Sanne van den Bergh, Greg Ward
Magnus — Benjamin Ree
Portrait of a Garden (Portret van een tuin) — Rosie Stapel
Prison Dogs — Perri Peltz, Geeta Gandbhir
Seasons (Les Saisons) — Jacques Perrin, Jacques Cluzaud
Shadow World — Johan Grimonprez
Snow Monkey — George Gittoes
Strangers on the Earth — Tristan Cook
Tempestad — Tatiana Huezo
Tickling Giants — Sara Taksler
Tower — Keith Maitland
When Two Worlds Collide — Heidi Brandenburg Sierralta, Mathew Orzel

True North
1:54 — Yan England
Darwin — Benjamin Duffield
The Intestine — Lev Lewis
King Dave — Daniel Grou
Lights Above Water (Lumières sur l'eau) — Nicolas Lachapelle, Ariel St-Louis Lamoureux
Living With Giants (Chez les géants) — Aude Leroux-Lévesque, Sébastien Rist
The Lockpicker — Randall Okita
Mean Dreams — Nathan Morlando
Nelly — Anne Émond
Never Eat Alone — Sofia Bohdanowicz
Of Ink and Blood (D'encre et de sang) — Alexis Fortier Gauthier, Maxim Rheault, Francis Fortin
Old Stone — Johnny Ma
The Other Half — Joey Klein
Quebec My Country Mon Pays — John Walker
Searchers (Maliglutit) — Zacharias Kunuk
Shambles (Maudite poutine) — Karl Lemieux
Split (Écartée) — Lawrence Côté-Collins
Tales of Two Who Dreamt — Andrea Bussmann, Nicolás Pereda
We Can't Make the Same Mistake Twice — Alanis Obomsawin
Weirdos — Bruce McDonald
Werewolf — Ashley McKenzie
Where the Universe Sings: The Spiritual Journey of Lawren Harris — Nancy Lang, Peter Raymont

Gateway
After the Storm — Hirokazu Kore-eda
Alone — Park Hongmin
The Bacchus Lady — E J-yong
Beautiful 2016 — Jia Zhangke, Stanley Kwan, Hideo Nakata, Alec Su
By the Time It Gets Dark — Anocha Suwichakornpong
A Copy of My Mind — Joko Anwar
Crosscurrent — Yang Chao
Godspeed — Chung Mong-hong
Harmonium — Kōji Fukada
Hema Hema: Sing Me a Song While I Wait — Khyentse Norbu
Knife in the Clear Water — Wang Xuebo
Life After Life — Zhang Hanyi
Lifeline — Akihiko Shiota
The Long Excuse — Miwa Nishikawa
Mother (Emma) — Riri Riza
Mrs. — Adolfo Alix Jr.
Our Love Story — Lee Hyun-ju
Out of the Frying Pan... — Takashi Komatsu
Phantom Detective — Jo Sung-hee
The Road to Mandalay — Midi Z
A Simple Goodbye — Degena Yun
Ta'ang — Wang Bing
Ten Years — Kwok Zune, Wong Fei-pang, Jevons Au, Chow Kwun-Wai, Ng Ka-leung
While the Women Are Sleeping — Wayne Wang
Yellowing — Chan Tze Woon
Yourself and Yours — Hong Sang-soo

BC Spotlight
Cadence — Alexander Lasheras
Hello Destroyer — Kevan Funk
Keepers of the Magic — Vic Sarin
Koneline: Our Land Beautiful — Nettie Wild
Marrying the Family — Peter Benson
Mixed Match — Jeff Chiba Stearns
A New Moon Over Tohoku — Linda Ohana
Spirit Unforgettable — Pete McCormack
The Unseen — Geoff Redknap
Window Horses — Ann Marie Fleming

Impact
Bugs — Andreas Johnsen
Command and Control — Robert Kenner
Fire at Sea (Fuocoammare) — Gianfranco Rosi
Freightened: The Real Price of Shipping — Denis Delestrac
Power to Change: The Energy Rebellion — Carl-A. Fechner
Rat Film — Theo Anthony
RiverBlue — David McIlvride, Roger Williams
Sonita — Rokhsareh Ghaemmaghami
Two Trains Runnin''' — Sam Pollard

M/A/DThe Architect — Jonathan ParkerBANG! The Bert Berns Story — Bob Sarles, Brett BernsBurden — Tim Marrianan, Richard DeweyThe Chinese Lives of Uli Sigg — Michael SchindhelmDon't Blink – Robert Frank — Laura IsraelFranca: Chaos and Creation — Francesco CarrozziniGimme Danger — Jim JarmuschHarold and Lillian: A Hollywood Love Story — Daniel RaimHarry Benson: Shoot First — Matthew Miele, Justin BareI Called Him Morgan — Kasper CollinThe Model — Mads MatthiesenPlaying Lecuona — Juan Manuel Villar Betancort, Pavel GiroudReset (Relève) — Thierry Demaizière, Alban TeurlaiVersus: The Life and Films of Ken Loach — Louise OsmondVita Activa: The Spirit of Hannah Arendt — Ada UshpizWe Are X — Stephen KijakYarn — Una LorenzenYohji Yamamoto: Dressmaker — Ngo The Chau

Altered StatesAnother Evil — Carson MellThe Eyes of My Mother — Nicolas PesceIn a Valley of Violence — Ti WestLavender — Ed Gass-DonnellyLittle Sister — Zach ClarkThe Love Witch — Anna BillerOperation Avalanche — Matt JohnsonShe's Allergic to Cats — Michael ReichUnder the Shadow — Babak AnvariWe Are the Flesh (Temenos la carne) — Emiliano Rocha Minter

Canadian Short Films24.24.24 — Daniel DietzelAnother Prayer — Sofia BohdanowiczAs Dinosaurs — Émilie RosasBeyond Blue Waves — Joëlle Desjardins PaquetteBlack Cop — Cory BowlesBlind Vaysha — Theodore UshevA Brief History of the Apocalypse — Erica Généreux SmithBy the Pool — Karine BélangerCabbie — Jessica Parsons, Jennifer ChiuThe Cameraman — Connor GastonCarver — Jeremy WamissCave of Sighs — Nathan DouglasClouds — Diego MacleanColour — Taryn Birket, Alannah JohnsonA Dance For... — Emily FengDataMine — Tim TraceyDora Blondin — Iris, Naomi, Paige, Tayla Einst — Jessica JohnsonEmma — Martin EdralinAn Evening — Sofia BohdanowiczFantassut/Rain on the Borders — Federica FogliaFish — Heather YoungFour Faces of the Moon — Amanda StrongGanjy — Benjamin RatnerHere Nor There — Julia HutchingsHomesick — Sophie JarvisI Am Here — Eoin DuffyIf You See Something — Daria AzizianImitations — Markus Henkel, Milos Mitrovic, Ian Bawa, Fabian VelascoIt's No Real Pleasure in Life — Nikolay MichaylovLast Night — Joel SalaysayLate Night Drama — Patrice LalibertéThe Lift — Manny MahalMamie — Janice NadeauThe Movieland Movie — Zachary KerrholdenMy Body — Annie Kruger, Danica Denommé, Florence Dubé, Ryan TitusThe New Canada — Alexander CarsonNine Behind — Sophy RomvariNutag: Homeland — Alisi TelengutOh What a Wonderful Feeling — François JarosOld Man — Alicia EisenParent, Teacher — Roman TchjenPopsong — Matthew Taylor BlaisA Prayer — Sofia BohdanowiczRanger — Sandra IgnagniSeven Stars — Sofia BanzhafSigismond Imageless — Albéric AurtenècheSrorrim — Wayne WapeemukwaStone Makers (Carrière) — Jean-Marc E. RoyThe Taste of Vietnam — Pier-Luc LatulippeThis Home Is Not Empty — Carol NguyenThose Who Remain (Ceux qui restent) — Mathieu VachonTwo — Christopher Spencer-LoweVlad the Unemployed — Ashley KobayashiWild Skin (La Peau sauvage) — Ariane Louis-SeizeYour Mother and I — Anna Maguire

International Short FilmsAeris — Lukas HuffmanAffordance — Nove HatayoAlbedo Absolute — Vlad MarsavinAprès Suzanne — Félix MoatiAs One — Alan PowellBest Efforts — Hadley HillelBetween Them — Alexia MaltnerBlack Pudding — Nicole NabiCatch — Dominic Rees-Roberts, Paul CookeChampion — Andrés PassoniConslitruction — Nakanishi YoshihisaDatum Point — Orikawa RyoDear Drew — Dylan ShapiroDon't Leave Me — Laura JouÉclair — Hugo KeijzerEden Hostel — Gonzaga MansoEncounter — Fabrizio RinaldiFabrizio's Initiation — Mariano BiasinFinder — Satoh YoshinaoFriday Night — Alexis MichalikGrown Up — Hong-Ruei LinHeaven — Hirabayashi IsamuHer Paradise — Shobi SenHow to Get People to Like You — Alexandra YakovlevaI Have the Future — Ouchi RiekoI Love Anna — Joonas RutanenIndefinite Pitch — James N. Kienitz WilkinsThe Laughing Spider — Tanaami KeiichiThe Law of Moments — Emma SammsLitterbugs — Peter Stanley-WardLock In — Neville PierceMinor Setback — Augustine FrizzellOn the Roof — Damia Serra CauchetiezOut of the Village — Jonathan SteinPainterbrain — Glenn DiehlParis, 1971 — David KhachatorianPromise — Akihiko ShiotaRotten Love — Matt LacorteSanun — Kyle Nieva, Miggy HilarioSoju and Ice Cream — Lee Kwang-kukThe Sparrow's Flight — Tom SchroederStars — Krista VernoffThis Modern Man Is Beat — Alex MerkinThree Minute Warning — Iqbal MohammedTide — Alexander von HofmannToday They Took My Son — Pierre DawalibiVanya — Christine RabotenkoWalden Pink — Peter BolteWhen Day Is Done — Brandon RootsWinds of Furnace — Yamil QuintanaWithout You'' — Nariman Aliev

References

Vancouver
Vancouver
Vancouver
Vancouver International Film Festival